Alastair Malcolm Leithead (born 1972) is an English journalist working as a foreign correspondent for the BBC. Leithead was based in Nairobi from 2015 to 2019. He works across all BBC News outlets.

Early life
Alastair Leithead was born in Amersham to Arthur Leithead, a security manager, and Edna Leithead (née Mooney), a teacher in private education. He was raised in Blaydon-on-Tyne and educated at the Royal Grammar School, Newcastle.  He then went to the University of Manchester to study geography.

Early career
After leaving University, Leithead worked at the Newcastle Evening Chronicle before joining BBC Radio Newcastle.  Later he worked as a news producer in London.

Foreign reporting
As a foreign correspondent, Leithead has been based in Africa and Asia before moving to Kabul.  There he covered the war in Afghanistan. Leithead has reported from a refugee camp in South Sudan.
More recently, he has been based in Los Angeles before being re-located to Kenya as the BBC's Africa Correspondent in July 2015.

Awards 
Leithead won the 2007 Bayeux-Calvados Awards for war correspondents Television Award for his war reporting. In 2005/6 he was shortlisted for the Royal Television Society's TV Journalism Award, and in 2008 he was shortlisted for a BAFTA for best news coverage.

References

External links

, Alastair Leithead Twitter.

1972 births
Living people
English journalists
People educated at the Royal Grammar School, Newcastle upon Tyne
Alumni of the University of Manchester
BBC newsreaders and journalists
People from Amersham